The East Hokkaido Cranes are a professional ice hockey team based in Kushiro, Japan. They are a members of the Asia League Ice Hockey and play their home games at the Kushiro Ice Arena.

History
The East Hokkaido Cranes formed in April 2019, as a phoenix club following the demise of the Nippon Paper Cranes franchise. The Paper Cranes had previously existed for 70 years; however, their owners, Nippon Paper Industries, announced in December 2018 that the team would be put up for sale as a result of corporate streamlining and declining revenues. No buyer was found, and as a result the team folded. 

The East Hokkaido Ice Hockey Club LLC, led by Tanaka Shigeki, announced that they had secured ¥125 million of founding, enabling the establishment of the new team. Asia League Ice Hockey chairman Sumio Kobayashi announced on 23 April 2019 that the new franchise would join the league, replacing the Paper Cranes, whilst retaining 15 players and playing out of the same arena.

The Cranes played their first regular season game on 31 August 2019, losing 3–2 to the Nikkō Ice Bucks, with forward Taiga Irikura scoring the first goal in franchise history.

Honours
All Japan Championship:
Winners (2): 2020, 2021

Roster
Updated May, 2022.

References

External links
 East Hokkaido Cranes official website 

Asia League Ice Hockey teams
Ice hockey clubs established in 2019
Sports teams in Hokkaido
Ice hockey teams in Japan